Nika Ninua (born 22 June 1999) is a Georgian professional footballer who plays as a midfielder for Greek Super League 2 club PAOK B.

Career
Ninua was born in Tbilisi on June 22, 1999. His talent stood out from an early age and he soon joined the youth academy at FC Dinamo Tbilisi, while at the same time from 2014 he became a Georgian international with his country’s youth teams.

Dinamo Tbilisi
In November 2016 he was included in the first-team squad and began to find a role for himself. He made his debut soon afterwards, and by the end of that season he made 18 appearances, while on June 17, 2017 he scored his debut professional goal.

He gradually became integral in the squad and, despite his young age, he was selected the captain’s armband. His big breakthrough season came in the 2019 Erovnuli Liga, when he scored eight goals and provided 11 assists in 37 matches.

His overall record at Dinamo Tbilisi reads: 95 games, 14 goals, and 15 assists, while he also celebrated two Erovnuli Liga titles, and became a key member of the Georgia U21 team.

PAOK
On 14 August 2020, PAOK announced the signing of Ninua, until summer 2024. According to Georgian sources, the transfer fee paid to Dinamo Tbilisi was €850,000.

Anorthosis loan
On 30 August 2021, Ninua joined Anorthosis on a season-long loan.

Lamia loan
On 30 August 2022, Ninua joined Lamia on a season-long loan.

Career statistics

Club

Notes

Honours

Club
Dinamo Tbilisi
Erovnuli Liga: 2019,  2020

PAOK
Greek Cup: 2020–21

References

External links

Living people
1999 births
Footballers from Tbilisi
Association football midfielders
Footballers from Georgia (country)
Georgia (country) under-21 international footballers
Erovnuli Liga players
Super League Greece players
Super League Greece 2 players
FC Dinamo Tbilisi players
PAOK FC players
PAOK FC B players
Expatriate footballers from Georgia (country)
Expatriate footballers in Greece